Coniceps is a genus of flies in the family Richardiidae. There is one described species in Coniceps, C. niger.

References

Further reading

 

Articles created by Qbugbot
Tephritoidea genera